Thomas Ingler (by 1516 – 26 September 1574), of Linkfield, Reigate, Surrey and the Middle Temple, London, was an English politician.

He was a Member (MP) of the Parliament of England for Reigate in October 1553.

References

1574 deaths
English MPs 1553 (Mary I)
People from Surrey
Members of the Middle Temple
Year of birth uncertain